Knopp, also known as Knopp-Melton, is a neighborhood of Louisville, Kentucky located along Grade Lane and Knopp Avenue.

References

Neighborhoods in Louisville, Kentucky